Karmala (Rural) is a village in the Karmala taluka of Solapur district in Maharashtra state, India.

Demographics
Covering  and comprising 265 households at the time of the 2011 census of India, Karmala (Rural) had a population of 1280. There were 670 males and 610 females, with 167 people being aged six or younger.

References

Villages in Karmala taluka